Albion Keith Parris (January 19, 1788 – February 11, 1857) was the 5th Governor of Maine, a United States representative from the District of Maine, Massachusetts, a United States senator from Maine, a United States district judge of the United States District Court for the District of Maine, an associate justice of the Maine Supreme Judicial Court and the 2nd Comptroller of the Currency for the United States Department of the Treasury.

Education and career

Born on January 19, 1788, in Hebron, District of Maine (then part of Massachusetts), Parris graduated from Dartmouth College in 1806 and read law in 1809. He was admitted to the bar and entered private practice in Paris, District of Maine from 1810 to 1811. He was prosecutor for Oxford County, District of Maine from 1811 to 1813. He was a member of the Massachusetts House of Representatives from Paris, District of Maine from 1813 to 1814. He was a member of the Massachusetts Senate from Oxford and Somerset Counties, District of Maine from 1814 to 1815.

United States representative 

Parris was elected as a Democratic-Republican from Massachusetts's 20th congressional district (representing the District of Maine) to the United States House of Representatives of the 14th and 15th United States Congresses and served from March 4, 1815, to February 3, 1818, when he resigned to accept a federal judicial position. He was a delegate to the Maine constitutional convention in 1819.

Federal judicial service and gubernatorial service

Parris was nominated by President James Monroe on January 27, 1818, to a seat on the United States District Court for the District of Maine vacated by Judge David Sewall. He was confirmed by the United States Senate on January 28, 1818, and received his commission the same day. His service terminated on January 1, 1822, due to his resignation. Concurrently with his federal judicial service, he was a Judge of the Cumberland County Probate Court from 1820 to 1821. During his judicial service, the District of Maine was admitted to the Union as the State of Maine on March 15, 1820. He was the 5th Governor of Maine from 1822 to 1827.

United States senator 

Parris was elected to the United States Senate from Maine and served from March 4, 1827, to August 26, 1828, when he resigned.

Later career

Parris was an associate justice of the Maine Supreme Judicial Court from 1828 to 1836. He was the 2nd Comptroller of the Currency for the United States Department of the Treasury from 1836 to 1850. He resumed private practice in Portland, Maine from 1849 to 1852. He was the Mayor of Portland in 1852. He was an unsuccessful Democratic candidate for Governor of Maine in 1854, losing to Know Nothing candidate Anson Morrill. He died on February 11, 1857, in Portland. He was interred in Western Cemetery in Portland.

Special service

In the fall of 1846, Parris served as one of the three commissioners negotiating a treaty at Washington, D.C. with the Winnebago (Ho-Chunk) Indians.

Family

Parris was the cousin of Virgil D. Parris, a United States representative from Maine.

References

Sources

 
 Gravesite https://www.findagrave.com/memorial/7125172/albion-keith-parris

1788 births
1857 deaths
Dartmouth College alumni
Democratic Party governors of Maine
Maine state court judges
Justices of the Maine Supreme Judicial Court
Mayors of Portland, Maine
Members of the Massachusetts House of Representatives
Massachusetts state senators
Members of the United States House of Representatives from Massachusetts
People from Hebron, Maine
Democratic Party United States senators from Maine
Judges of the United States District Court for the District of Maine
United States federal judges appointed by James Monroe
19th-century American judges
Maine Democratic-Republicans
Maine Jacksonians
Democratic-Republican Party United States senators
Democratic-Republican Party members of the United States House of Representatives from the District of Maine
Massachusetts Democratic-Republicans
Burials at Western Cemetery (Portland, Maine)
Democratic-Republican Party state governors of the United States
19th-century American politicians